Soreutoneura is a monotypic moth genus in the subfamily Lymantriinae. Its only species, Soreutoneura daedala, is found in New Guinea. Both the genus and the species were first described by Cyril Leslie Collenette in 1930.

References

Lymantriinae
Monotypic moth genera